San Jerónimo Nejapa  is a Salvadoran professional football club based in Nejapa,  El Salvador.

The club currently plays in the Tercera Division de Fútbol Salvadoreño.

The club was founded in 2013.

List of Coaches
  René Martínez

References

Football clubs in El Salvador